Neotinea maculata, the dense-flowered orchid, is an orchid native to Asia Minor and parts of Europe and North Africa.
 (Codes)

Description 
The leaves are oblong, 5 cm in length, and form a basal rosette which develops from round underground nodules that are up to 6 cm in diameter. Stems supported emerge vertically from the rosette and are covered for a third of their length with a light green bract. The flowering period is from April to June, during which an inflorescence of small white to pink flowers are produced.

References 

 Bateman R.M., 2003  Molecular phylogenetics and evolution of Orchidinae and selected Habenariinae (Orchidaceae). Bot. J. Linn. Soc. 2003; 142(1): 1-40.
 Delforge P., 2001 Guide des orchidées D'Europe, d'Afrique du Nord et du Proche-Orient, 2° ed, Lausanne, Delachaux et Niestlé

External links 
Neotinea maculata Pierre Delforge

Orchideae
Orchids of Europe
Orchids of Lebanon
Flora of Malta